The Terrey Hills Golf & Country Club is a golf club in Terrey Hills, New South Wales, Australia. It hosted the Women's Australian Open in 2003 when the champion was Mhairi McKay of Scotland.

See also

List of golf courses in New South Wales

References

External links

Terrey Hills Golf & Country Club Course review, Golf Australia

Golf clubs and courses in New South Wales
Sporting clubs in Sydney
Sports venues in Sydney